The Lateish Show with Mo Gilligan is a British late-night chat show presented by comedian Mo Gilligan, that first aired on Channel 4 on 19 July 2019. Similar to other late night chat shows, the programme includes a house band, live audience and comedy sketches as well as interviews with celebrities and other guests. The show took inspiration from the 1990s entertainment show TFI Friday.

In June 2020, Channel 4 renewed the show for a second series in 2021.

History 
In August 2018, Channel 4 commissioned the programme for six episodes, originally under the name Mo's Show. Gilligan said that the show had been under development for two years prior to its announcement. The show was produced by Expectation and Momo G.

Gilligan is a stand-up comedian. His first presenting experience was as co-host with rapper Big Narstie on The Big Narstie Show, which premiered in June 2018. As creator, associate producer and writer, Gilligan also had involvement in all aspects of the show's production, including conceiving of many of the sketches and ideas.

Episodes

Series 1 (2019)

Series 2 (2021)

Series 3 (2022)

Reception 
The Guardian reviewers Ellen E Jones and Jack Seale both praised Gilligan's confidence in hosting. Seale described the format as "mixing eclectic lineups with musical and comic set pieces in a way that is fresh without being revolutionary". However, Jones found the sketches "hit and miss".

In 2020, the show had won a BAFTA in the "Entertainment Performance" category.

References

External links
 

2019 British television series debuts
2010s British comedy television series
2010s British television talk shows
2020s British comedy television series
2020s British television talk shows
2010s British television sketch shows
2020s British television sketch shows
Channel 4 talk shows
English-language television shows